The FSP Gold River Women's Challenger was a tournament for professional female tennis players played on outdoor hardcourts. The event was classified as a $60,000 ITF Women's Circuit tournament and had been held in Sacramento, California since 2012.

Past finals

Singles

Doubles

External links
 ITF search 

ITF Women's World Tennis Tour
Hard court tennis tournaments in the United States
Tennis tournaments in California
Recurring sporting events established in 2012
2012 establishments in California
Sports in Sacramento, California
 
Women's sports in California